Gülşah is a feminine name and it may refer to:

 Gülşah Hatun (died c. 1487), a wife of Mehmed II of the Ottoman Empire
 Gülşah Akkaya (born 1977), Turkish basketballer
 Gülşah Düzgün (born 1995), Turkish Paralympian goalball player
 Gülşah Gümüşay (born 1989), Turkish basketballer
 Gülşah Günenç (born 1985), Turkish swimmer
 Gülşah Kıyak (born 1989), Turkish wushu practitioner
 Gülşah Kocatürk (born 1986), Turkish female judoka

Turkish feminine given names